Gonippo Raggi (May 6, 1875October 22, 1959) was an Italian artist who provided murals for many churches and church institutions in the United States.

Early childhood and education
He was born in Rome, Italy, in 1875.  He was a prize graduate of St. Luke's Royal Academy in Rome and his artistic talent brought him membership in the Pontifical Academy of Virtuosi al Pantheon.

Artistic practice
He came to the United States in 1904 at the invitation of Papal Marquis Martin Maloney to supervise the decoration of St. Catharine Church in Spring Lake, New Jersey.  Maloney had erected the church as a memorial to his daughter, Catherine.  Raggi drew the attention of Rev. Thomas J. Walsh, then Bishop of Trenton.  When Walsh became Bishop of Newark, he encouraged Raggi to continue his work in the Newark diocese.  Raggi was internationally acclaimed as a portraitist and ecclesiastical artist.  and supervised the decoration of the Cathedral of the Sacred Heart in Newark.  He died in 1959.

Several of the buildings containing Raggi's murals have been placed on the National Register of Historic Places. All of Raggi's paintings done before 1915 were cataloged by the Smithsonian Institution. Other work by Raggi is cataloged by the Boston Public Library, Department of Fine Arts.

Raggi works
 Basilica of St. Josaphat, Milwaukee, Wisconsin
 St. Patrick Pro Cathedral, Newark, New Jersey
 St. Catharine Church, Spring Lake, New Jersey
 Cathedral Basilica of the Sacred Heart, Newark, New Jersey
 St. Lucy's Church, Newark, New Jersey
 Immaculate Conception Seminary Chapel, Darlington, New Jersey
 Our Lady of Good Counsel Church, Newark, New Jersey
 St. Mary of Mount Virgin Church, New Brunswick, New Jersey
 Villa Walsh Convent Chapel, Morristown, New Jersey
 Notre Dame Church, Southbridge, Massachusetts
 Liberal Arts Building and Rotunda at Marywood College, Scranton, Pennsylvania
 St. John The Baptist Catholic Church, Beloit, Kansas
 Chapel, St. John Seminary, Brighton, Boston, Massachusetts
 Our Lady of Victory Basilica, Lackawanna, New York
 Mary Immaculate of Lourdes Catholic Church, Newton, Massachusetts
 Shrine of the Little Flower Catholic Church, Baltimore, Maryland
 St. John the Evangelist Church, Pittston, PA

References

1875 births
1959 deaths
Artists from Rome
Italian emigrants to the United States